AEW Rampage, also known as Friday Night Rampage or simply Rampage, is an American professional wrestling television program produced by the American promotion All Elite Wrestling (AEW). It airs every Friday at 10 p.m. Eastern Time (ET) on TNT in the United States. It is AEW's second weekly television show, positioned behind their flagship show, Dynamite. AEW Rampage is the second professional wrestling program to air on TNT since the final episode of WCW Monday Nitro on March 26, 2001.

History
All Elite Wrestling (AEW) was officially announced and launched on January 1, 2019, and their weekly flagship television program, Dynamite, began airing on TNT that October. On January 15, 2020, TNT's parent company WarnerMedia and AEW announced a US$175 million contract extension for Dynamite through 2023. As part of the new deal, it was also announced that AEW would be launching a second weekly television show.

In May 2021, AEW revealed their second weekly television show, and fourth program overall, as AEW Rampage, which would begin airing on TNT on August 13 as a one-hour show on Fridays at 10pm Eastern Time (ET). During AEW's marquee event Double or Nothing on May 30, former WWE wrestler Mark Henry was announced to be a part of the Rampage commentary team as an analyst. On August 4, Dynamite and Darks commentators Excalibur and Taz and wrestler Chris Jericho, who had served as a guest commentator several times on Dynamite, were announced to join Henry as Rampages four-man commentary team. AEW President and Chief Executive Officer Tony Khan said that the commentary team would not always be all four men, as Henry would also have other roles on the show, such as doing interviews. In September, AEW wrestler Ricky Starks replaced Henry on the commentary team, with Henry now just doing interviews on the show.

In an interview with PWInsider, Khan stated that while Rampage would air live for most episodes, some episodes they would pre-tape, depending on the city that the preceding episode of Dynamite was held in. He also said that Rampage would serve as the go-home show for AEW's pay-per-views (PPV), due to the show airing two days before those events, in turn replacing Dark, as although Dark normally airs on Tuesdays, it would instead air on Fridays during the week of a PPV to serve as the go-home show. Khan also said that WarnerMedia had asked him if he would rather expand Wednesday's Dynamite to three hours, but he rejected the notion, stating that he did not want to run Dynamite for that length as he really wanted that third hour as a separate show on a different night. He also claimed that Rampage would not be a secondary show to Dynamite, and that it would be its partner or its equivalent. He further said that Dynamite and Rampage would be AEW's core properties, while their YouTube shows, Dark and Elevation, would be their peripheral properties, essentially their developmental shows.

Rampage airs immediately following WWE's own Friday television program, SmackDown, which airs on Fox. Although Dynamite had run against WWE's NXT from October 2019 to April 2021, there was expectation that there would be no overlap between Rampage and SmackDown in nearly the entire country unless the latter were to run over its scheduled time, which ends at 10pm ET, when Rampage begins broadcasting. To date, this has occurred only once, which was on October 15, 2021. That night, SmackDown aired a special episode titled "Supersized SmackDown", which extended its runtime to 10:30pm with the additional 30 minutes airing commercial free, therefore directly competing with Rampage for its first 30 minutes. SmackDown had also aired on Fox's sister channel FS1 due to the MLB playoffs airing on Fox, which also decreased SmackDowns normal average viewership. During the 30 minutes that the shows went head-to-head, Rampage beat SmackDown in the key demographic of viewers aged 18 to 49, drawing 328,000 views to SmackDowns 285,000 views.

It was initially announced that both Dynamite and Rampage would be moving to TNT's sister channel TBS, also owned by WarnerMedia, in January 2022. However, on September 23, 2021, it was revealed that Rampage would remain on TNT while only Dynamite would move to TBS.

The May 6 and May 13, 2022, episodes of Rampage were moved to 5:30 p.m. ET in order to accommodate TNT's coverage of the NHL Stanley Cup playoffs. The May 20 episode was moved to 7 p.m. ET to make way for TNT's coverage of the NBA Western Conference Finals.

Special episodes

Roster

The wrestlers featured on AEW Rampage take part in scripted feuds and storylines. Wrestlers are portrayed as heroes, villains, or less distinguishable characters during scripted events that build tension and culminate in a wrestling match.

Commentators

Ring announcers

Broadcasting
In the United States, Rampage currently airs live on Fridays on TNT at 10pm ET. The program was to move to TBS in January 2022, but in September, AEW announced that while Dynamite would move to TBS, Rampage would remain on TNT.

On September 25, 2019, AEW announced an international streaming deal with FITE TV primarily for regions outside of the United States and Canada via the "AEW Plus" package, which includes live streaming and replay access of Dynamite in simulcast with its U.S. airing. This was expanded to include Rampage.

Canada
On August 9, 2021, PWInsider reported that TSN, which airs Dynamite in Canada, would stream Rampage online in simulcast with the U.S. through its website and TSN Direct service.

Europe
On July 3, 2021, WarnerTV Serie (known as TNT Serie until 24 September 2021) announced a deal to air Rampage on Monday nights in Germany.

On July 6, 2021, Toonami (another WarnerMedia channel) announced a deal to air Rampage in France.

On August 27, 2021, Sky Sport (owned by Comcast, which holds rights to a rival wrestling promotion, WWE in the United States) and AEW announced that Rampage would air on Mondays nights in Italy.

On January 1, 2022, AEW announced that Rampage would be broadcast every Tuesday night on ITV4 with repeats every Thursday night on ITV1 in the United Kingdom, it is also available to view on their streaming service ITVX.

On February 10, 2022, Warner TV announced that they would air Rampage in Poland.

In Spain, AEW announced that was going to air Rampage on TNT starting on June 19, 2022.

Latin America
On October 22, 2020, AEW reached an agreement with the digital platform Pluto TV, broadcasting its repeat events (including past pay-per-view) with commentators in Spanish from Latin America.

On October 1, 2021, Rampage began airing on Space, a WarnerMedia International channel in Brazil and on Space's Spanish feed, available throughout Latin America on Saturdays. On September 30, 2022, it was announced that AEW would stop airing on Space in Latin America on October 1, with Brazil following on December 30.

Africa
Rampage began airing on TNT Africa on October 2, 2021, in Sub-Saharan Africa. The show airs every Saturday morning at 10 AM CAT, one week after the U.S. broadcast.

Asia
In India, Rampage airs on Eurosport starting on August 15, 2021, and later at the same time as the American airing from August 21, 2021, every Saturday 7:30 AM IST.  Eurosport is owned by Discovery Communications, which is set to acquire WarnerMedia later in 2021. Rampage began airing on Premier Sports in the Philippines in October 2021 On April 8, 2022, it was announced that as part of the AEW and NJPW working relationship that Rampage would air in Japan on NJPW World.

Oceania
Rampage will air on ESPN2 starting February 18th 2023 in Australia, New Zealand, Fiji, Samoa, Tonga, Cook Islands, Solomon Islands, Niue, Nauru, Vanuatu, Kiribati, Northern Marianas, Tokelau, Tahiti, Tuvalu, New Caledonia, American Samoa, Marshall Islands, Palau, Federated States of Micronesia, Papua New Guinea, and Wallis and Futuna.

See also

List of professional wrestling television series

Notes

References

External links
 
 
 

Rampage
2021 American television series debuts
2020s American television series
American live television series
American professional wrestling television series
English-language television shows
TNT (American TV network) original programming